Ivor Skovorodkin is a Belarusian sprint canoer who competed in the early 2000s. He won a silver medal at the 2001 ICF Canoe Sprint World Championships in Poznań.

References

Belarusian male canoeists
Living people
Year of birth missing (living people)
ICF Canoe Sprint World Championships medalists in Canadian